Shivam may refer to:

People
 Shivam Chauhan (born 1997), Indian cricketer
 Shivam Dubey (born 1993), Indian cricketer
 Shivam Malhotra (born 1991), Indian cricketer
 Shivam Nair, Indian film and television director and editor
 Shivam Patil, Indian actor and dancer
 Shivam Pradhan (died 2016), Indian film actor
 Shivam Sai Gupta (born 1995), Indian visual effect producer, public speaker, and game developer
 Shivam Sharma (born 1993), Indian cricketer
Shivam Sharma (cricketer, born 2000), Indian cricketer

Film and Television
 Shivam (TV series)
 Shivam (2002 film)
 Shivam (2015 Kannada film)
 Shivam (2015 Telugu film)